Contributors to the online encyclopedia Wikipedia license their submitted content under a Creative Commons license, which permits re-use as long as attribution is given. However, there have been a number of occasions when persons have failed to give the necessary attribution and attempted to pass off material from Wikipedia as their own work. Such plagiarism is a violation of the Creative Commons license and, when discovered, can be a reason for embarrassment, professional sanctions, or legal issues.

In educational settings, students sometimes copy Wikipedia to fulfill class assignments. A 2011 study by Turnitin found that Wikipedia was the most copied website by both secondary and higher education students.

Notable instances 
Many notable individuals and institutions have been credibly said to have committed plagiarism from Wikipedia.

Chris Anderson (writer)
Jill Bialosky
Monica Crowley
Five Star Movement (Italian political party)
Jane Goodall
Michel Houellebecq
International Baccalaureate Organisation (IBO) was accused of copying IB test questions from Wikipedia
Internet Research Agency
Benny Johnson (journalist)
Siniša Mali, Serbian Finance Minister, who was found by the University of Belgrade to have plagiarized his Ph.D. thesis
John McCain
Yana Milev
Okayama Prefectural Assembly 
Oxford University Press
Rand Paul
The Pentagon
Peter Schweizer, in his 2018 book Secret Empires
Government of the United Kingdom, in its 2022 "Levelling Up" white paper.
Gerónimo Vargas Aignasse
Fabiola Yáñez
Alejandro Zaera-Polo
Santa Clara County grantwriter
Elsevier retracted a 2020 book for plagiarizing many large passages from Wikipedia.

See also
Index of plagiarism-related articles

References

Wikipedia
Wikipedia
Copyright infringement